Loy M. Petersen (born July 26, 1945) is a retired American professional basketball player who played in the National Basketball Association from 1968–1970. A guard, he played in college for Oregon State University, and was drafted in the second round (17th overall) of the 1968 NBA draft by the Chicago Bulls; previously, he was also drafted in the 17th round of the 1967 NBA draft by the Baltimore Bullets (now the Washington Wizards). He played in 69 career games over two seasons for the Bulls.

Loy now lives in Madras, Oregon, with his wife, Carol.

References
 Database Basketball – Loy Petersen stats

1945 births
Living people
American men's basketball players
Basketball players from Anaheim, California
Baltimore Bullets (1963–1973) draft picks
Chicago Bulls draft picks
Chicago Bulls players
Cleveland Cavaliers expansion draft picks
Oregon State Beavers men's basketball players
People from Madras, Oregon
Shooting guards